Heimkveld Kunst is an Ambient music band, founded in the late of 2005 by C.-04

Group development 
At the beginning, Heimkveld Kunst starts Dark Ambient and Experimental music, influenced by Black Metal, Dark Ambient and Symphonic Metal bands. Born in 2005, it's only in 2006 that first songs are create. They've got a bad audio quality, so C.-04 keep them secret, he just shows track-list on the web. After several months, Heimkveld Kunst stop doing Dark Ambient music and begin to make more Ambient songs, more relaxing, influenced by dreams and illusions...

Discography

Demos 
 2006: Prélude
 2007: Promo Mars 2007 (also known as Partie II)

Full-length and EPs 
 2009: MM V IX
 2009: Egaré Dans L'Oubli
 2010: Old & Abandoned Songs
 2010: Nature Sounds

Others 
 2007: Split with Decomposed Corpses.
 2007: Track Crépuscule de Tristesse appears on the compilation Obscure Synergy Chapter I.
 2008: Track Prière Universelle appears on the compilation Trinity on Tritherapie by the label Bone Structure
 2010: Secret Earth

References

External links 
Official Website
MySpace: Official Heimkveld Kunst Profile
Discogs: Heimkveld Kunst

Ambient music groups